Jean Baptiste Perrin  (30 September 1870 – 17 April 1942) was a French physicist who, in his studies of the Brownian motion of minute particles suspended in liquids (sedimentation equilibrium), verified Albert Einstein’s explanation of this phenomenon and thereby confirmed the atomic nature of matter. For this achievement he was honoured with the Nobel Prize for Physics in 1926.

Biography

Early years
Born in Lille, France, Perrin attended the École Normale Supérieure, the elite grande école in Paris. He became an assistant at the school during the period of 1894–97 when he began the study of cathode rays and X-rays.  He was awarded the degree of docteur ès sciences (beyond PhD) in 1897.   In the same year he was appointed as a lecturer in physical chemistry at the Sorbonne, Paris.  He became a professor at the University in 1910, holding this post until the German occupation of France during World War II.

Research and achievements

In 1895, Perrin showed that cathode rays were of negative electric charge in nature. He determined Avogadro's number (now known as the Avogadro constant) by several methods. He explained solar energy as due to the thermonuclear reactions of hydrogen.

After Albert Einstein published (1905) his theoretical explanation of Brownian motion in terms of atoms, Perrin did the experimental work to test and verify Einstein's predictions, thereby settling the century-long dispute about John Dalton's atomic theory. Carl Benedicks argued Perrin should receive the Nobel Prize in Physics; Perrin received the award in 1926 for this and other work on the discontinuous structure of matter, which put a definite end to the long struggle regarding the question of the physical reality of molecules.

Perrin was the author of a number of books and dissertations. Most notable of his publications were: "Rayons cathodiques et rayons X"; "Les Principes"; "Electrisation de contact"; "Réalité moléculaire"; "Matière et Lumière"; "Lumière et Reaction chimique".

Perrin was also the recipient of numerous prestigious awards including the Joule Prize of the Royal Society in 1896 and the La Caze Prize of the French Academy of Sciences.  He was twice appointed a member of the Solvay Committee at Brussels in 1911 and in 1921. He also held memberships with the Royal Society of London and with the Academies of Sciences of Belgium, Sweden, Turin, Prague, Romania and China. He became a Commander of the Legion of Honour in 1926 and was made Commander of the Order of Léopold (Belgium).

In 1919, Perrin proposed that nuclear reactions can provide the source of energy in stars. He realized that the mass of a helium atom is less than that of four atoms of hydrogen, and that the mass-energy equivalence of Einstein implies that the nuclear fusion (4 H → He) could liberate sufficient energy to make stars shine for billions of years. A similar theory was first proposed by American chemist William Draper Harkins in 1915. It remained for Hans Bethe and Carl Friedrich von Weizsäcker to determine the detailed mechanism of stellar nucleosynthesis during the 1930s.

In 1927, he founded the Institut de Biologie Physico-Chimique together with chemist André Job and physiologist André Mayer. Funding was provided by Edmond James de Rothschild. In 1937, Perrin established the Palais de la Découverte, a science museum in Paris.

Perrin is considered the founding father of the National Centre for Scientific Research (Centre National de la Recherche Scientifique (CNRS)). Following a petition by Perrin signed by over 80 scientists, among them eight Nobel Prize laureates, the French education minister set up the Conseil Supérieur de la Recherche Scientifique (French National Research Council) in April 1933. In 1936, Perrin, now an undersecretary for research, founded the Service Central de la Recherche Scientifique (French Central Agency for Scientific Research). Both institutions were merged under the CNRS umbrella on October 19, 1939.

His notable students include Pierre Victor Auger. Jean Perrin was the father of Francis Perrin, also a physicist.

Personal life and death
Perrin was an atheist and a socialist. He was an officer in the engineer corps during World War I.

After the death of Perrin's wife Henriette in 1938, Nine Choucroun (1896–1978), founder of the Nine Choucroun Prize, became Perrin's partner. In June 1940, when the Germans invaded France, Choucroun and Perrin escaped to Casablanca on the ocean liner Massilia, with part of the French government. In December 1941, they boarded the SS Excambion to New York City, arriving on December 23.

Perrin died at Mount Sinai Hospital in New York on 17 April 1942 at the age of 71.

After the War, in 1948, his remains were transported back to France by the cruiser Jeanne d'Arc and buried in the Panthéon.

Works 

 Les Principes. Exposé de thermodynamique (1901)/Principles of thermodynamics
 Traité de chimie physique. Les principes (1903)/Physical chemistry principles
 Les Preuves de la réalité moléculaire (1911)/Evidences of molecular reality
 
 Les Atomes (1913)/The Atoms
 Matière et lumière (1919)/Matter and light
 En l'honneur de Madame Pierre Curie et de la découverte du Radium (1922)/ In honor of Mrs Pierre Curie and the discovery of Radium
 Les Éléments de la physique (1929)/Elements of physics
 L'Orientation actuelle des sciences (1930)/Current orientation of sciences
 Les Formes chimiques de transition (1931)/Transition chemical forms
 La Recherche scientifique (1933)/Scientific research
 Cours de chimie. 1ère partie. Chimie générale et métalloïdes (1935)/ Chemistry courses: general chemistry and metalloids
 Grains de matière et grains de lumière (1935)/Grains of matter and grains of light
 Existence des grains/Existence of grains
 Structure des atomes/Structure of atoms
 Noyaux des atomes/Kernels of atoms
 Transmutations provoquées/Induced transmutations
 Paul Painlevé: l'homme (1936)/Paul Painlevé: the man
 L'Organisation de la recherche scientifique en France (1938)/The organisation of scientific research in France
 À la surface des choses (1940-1941)/At the surface of things
 Masse et gravitation (1940)/Mass and gravitation
 Lumière (1940)/Light 
 Espace et temps (1940)/Space and time
 Forces et travail (1940)/Forces and work
 Relativité (1941)/Relativity
 Électricité (1941)/Electricity
 L'énergie (1941)/Energy
 Évolution (1941)/Evolution
 L'Âme de la France éternelle (1942)/The soul of eternal France
 Pour la Libération (1942)/For Liberation
 La Science et l'Espérance (1948)/Science and hope
 Oeuvres scientifiques de Jean Perrin (1950)/Scientific works of Jean Perrin

References

External links

 
 
 Mouvement brownien et molécules, by Jean Perrin, 1923 on Vidéothèque du CNRS (French)
 Jean Perrin et la réalité moléculaire on Vidéothèque du CNRS (French)

1870 births
1942 deaths
20th-century French chemists
20th-century French physicists
École Normale Supérieure alumni
Burials at the Panthéon, Paris
Foreign Members of the Royal Society
French atheists
French socialists
Commandeurs of the Légion d'honneur
Nobel laureates in Physics
French Nobel laureates
University of Paris alumni
Members of the French Academy of Sciences
Corresponding Members of the Russian Academy of Sciences (1917–1925)
Corresponding Members of the USSR Academy of Sciences
Honorary Members of the USSR Academy of Sciences
Theoretical physicists
French physical chemists
French National Centre for Scientific Research scientists
Recipients of the Matteucci Medal
19th-century French physicists
Presidents of the Société Française de Physique